Normal Happiness is the sixth album by Robert Pollard.  Like its predecessor, it was recorded with Pollard on basic guitar and vocal tracks, with instrumental overdubs from producer Todd Tobias. Normal Happiness debuted at #46 on the Billboard Top Independent Albums chart [].

Pollard explained the writing process and the title of Normal Happiness in a Gothamist interview:
"I wrote a total of 47 songs and it just so happened that my favorite ones happened to be the poppier ones and that tone or attitude carried over into the recording process itself. I didn't feel the final product was overly "sappy" so I decided to call it "Normal Happiness". Not too heavy and not light. "
Working titles for the album were You Were Saying? and Gasoline Ragtime .

The album received a 72/100 rating at metacritic .

Track listing
 "The Accidental Texas Who"
 "Whispering Whip"
 "Supernatural Car Lover"
 "Boxing About"
 "Serious Bird Woman (You Turn Me On)"
 "Get a Faceful"
 "Towers and Landslides"
 "I Feel Gone Again"
 "Gasoline Ragtime"
 "Rhoda Rhoda"
 "Give Up the Grape"
 "Pegasus Glue Factory"
 "Top of My Game"
 "Tomorrow Will Not Be Another Day"
 "Join the Eagles"
 "Full Sun (Dig the Slowness)"

References

2006 albums
Robert Pollard albums